The 1916 Montana State Bobcats football team was an American football team that represented the Montana State College (later renamed Montana State University) during the 1916 college football season.  In its third season under head coach Fred Bennion, the team compiled a 2–2–2 record and was outscored by a total of 78 to 44.

Jay Duquette was the team captain.

In January 1916, following a student competition to select an appropriate nickname for the school's athletic teams, the nickname "Bobcats" was adopted. Students Fred Bullock and Rupert Streits were credited jointly with offering the name. The Great Falls Daily Tribune expressed approval of the choice: "Fighting, cunning, daring, resourceful and wary is the bobcat, and above all he is a resident of the Treasure state."

Schedule

References

Montana State
Montana State Bobcats football seasons
Montana State Bobcats football